Diana O. Perkins is an American professor at the University of North Carolina's (UNC) School of Medicine where she teaches psychiatry; she is a fellow with outreach roles. Her research involves early diagnosis and treatment of schizophrenia. She is noted for publishing a study that demonstrated that using a polygenic risk score (PRS) based on data from genome-wide association studies improved the psychosis risk prediction in persons meeting clinical high-risk criteria.

Education
Perkins' undergraduate work was completed at the University of Maryland in Psychology and Biochemistry; she received her Doctor of Medicine at University of Maryland School of Medicine. She completed a graduate degree in Epidemiology from UNC.

References

External links 
UNC Directory page

Living people
Year of birth missing (living people)
American women psychiatrists
American psychiatrists
21st-century American women
University System of Maryland alumni
University of North Carolina faculty